Ebrahimabad (also Romanized as Ebrāhīmābād) is a village in Zarrineh Rud-e Jonubi Rural District, in the Central District of Miandoab County, West Azerbaijan Province, Iran. At the 2006 census, its population was 937, in 203 families.

References 

Populated places in Miandoab County